The Endau River is a river that flows through the Malaysian state of Johor and empties to the South China Sea. The river is the namesake of the town of Endau, located at the south bank of the river, and Endau Rompin National Park, which is located to the northeast of Johor.

See also
 Geography of Malaysia
 List of rivers of Malaysia

Rivers of Johor
Rivers of Pahang